Pottstown Landing Historic District is a national historic district located in North Coventry Township, Chester County, Pennsylvania. The district includes 76 contributing buildings and 1 contributing site in the linear village of Pottstown Landing. The buildings date from the 18th to 20th century and primarily include residential buildings.  Also included are a number of contributing outbuildings, a school, and a church.  The oldest buildings are associated with the Joseph Rieff stone farmhouse (c. 1780). The village developed along the banks of the Schuylkill River and increased after the opening of the Schuylkill Canal.

It was added to the National Register of Historic Places in 2001.

References

Historic districts on the National Register of Historic Places in Pennsylvania
Historic districts in Chester County, Pennsylvania
National Register of Historic Places in Chester County, Pennsylvania